Ubaldo Maria Del Colle (27 June 1883 – 24 August 1958) was an Italian actor and film director. He directed more than one hundred films from 1911 to 1952.

Selected filmography
L'Odissea (dir. Francesco Bertolini, Adolfo Padovan and Giuseppe De Liguoro, 1911), as actor
Jone or the Last Days of Pompeii (1913)
...La bocca mi bacio tutto tremante (1919)
Tragic Carnival (1924)
 New Moon (1925)
Star of the Sea (1928)
Falsehood (1952)

References

External links 

1883 births
1958 deaths
Italian male film actors
Italian male silent film actors
20th-century Italian male actors
Italian film directors
Male actors from Rome